Tswaing is an impact crater in South Africa that is accompanied by a museum.  It is situated 40 km to the north-west of Pretoria. This astrobleme is 1.13 km in diameter and 100 m deep and the age is estimated to be 220,000 ± 52,000 years (Pleistocene). The impactor is believed to have been a chondrite or stony meteorite some 30 to 50 m in diameter that was vapourised during the impact event. Morokweng impact structure, another crater of chondrite origin, lies north-west of Vryburg.

Etymology
The name Tswaing means "place of salt" in Tswana and the crater was also formerly known in English as Pretoria Saltpan crater and in Afrikaans as Soutpankrater.

Palaeoclimatology
Lipid biomarkers and carbon and hydrogen isotopic ratios from the lake indicate the existence of regional humid climatic periods between 84,000 and 80,000 years BP and between 50,000 and 39,000 BP. In contrast, intervals of high aridity occurred around 76,000 BP, from 73,000 to 69,000 BP, from 55,000 to 51,000 BP, and from 31,400 to 12,600 BP. Since 84,000 BP, the vegetation of the region around the lake has been dominated by savanna-type plants.

History
Stone tools from the Middle Stone Age show that the crater was regularly visited by people from as far back as 100,000 years ago in order to hunt and collect salt. Water in the crater comes from surface springs, ground water and rain water and is rich in dissolved carbonates and sodium chlorides. Tswana and Sotho people harvested the salt by filtering and decoction between 1200 and 1800.  Between 1912 and 1956 brine was pumped from the floor of the crater by the company SA Alkali Ltd. in order to extract soda and salt.

A scientific dispute was ongoing regarding the origin of the crater between supporters of volcanic origin (Wagner, 1922) and those who believed it is an impact crater (Rohleder, 1933) until 1990, when examination of the core from a borehole proved that it is an impact crater.

Museum 

The impact crater is accompanied by a museum.

Status of protection 
Tswaing is currently on the tentative list for consideration as a World Heritage Site.

See also

 Impact event
 List of impact craters in Africa

References

External links
Tswaing Meteorite Crater
Hartebeesthoek Radio Astronomy Observatory writeup on the crater
City of Tswhane - Tswaing Meteorite Crater

Impact craters of South Africa
Pleistocene impact craters
Natural history museums in South Africa
Museums in Pretoria